Bedford Modern School (often called BMS) is a Headmasters' and Headmistresses' Conference independent school in Bedford, England. The school has its origins in The Harpur Trust, born from the endowments left by Sir William Harpur in the sixteenth century.  BMS comprises a junior school (ages 6–11) and a senior school (ages 11–18).

The school has had four names.  In 1873 the school became Bedford Modern School to reflect its modern curriculum, providing an education for the professions. BMS provided education not only for the locality but also for colonial and military personnel abroad, seeking good education for their young families.

History
Bedford Modern School has its origins in The Harpur Trust, born from the endowments left by Sir William Harpur in the sixteenth century. Since the separation of Bedford School and BMS in 1764, the School has had four names: the Writing School, the English School, the Commercial School and finally Bedford Modern School, the last change being made in 1873 to reflect the School's modern curriculum, providing an education for the professions.

BMS provided education not only for the locality but also for colonial and military personnel seeking good education for their young families.  In 1834 BMS moved from its original premises in St Paul's Square to buildings designed by Edward Blore in Harpur Square, Bedford.

The ‘Long Swim’ was established under Robert Poole (headmaster of BMS from 1877 to 1900), a ‘free-for-all’ swimming race in the River Great Ouse from Bedford town bridge to the ‘Suspension Bridge’. The gruelling event was stopped in 1957 due to river pollution. An annual compulsory steeplechase still takes place at the school for each year group.

During World War II, the inventors Cecil Vandepeer Clarke and Stuart Macrae took a prototype of their limpet mine to Bedford Modern School swimming baths, which were closed for such occasions. Clarke was an excellent swimmer and was able to propel himself through the water with a prototype bomb attached to a keeper plate on webbing around his waist.  

Dame Alice Owen's School was evacuated to BMS for the entire duration of World War II.

The school’s Prichard Museum, a collection of artefacts sent back to the school mainly from old boys around the world, became Bedford Museum.  George Witt was a major benefactor to the school's museum.

The successful growth of the school meant that the buildings became increasingly cramped and in 1974 the school moved to new premises in Bedford. The Foundation Stone for the new building was laid by Margaret Thatcher. On 11 May 1976, Queen Elizabeth II unveiled a commemorative panel at the new school building during her visit with Prince Philip, Duke of Edinburgh.

BMS became a coeducational day school in 2003. In 2014, BMS celebrated the 250th anniversary of its separation from Bedford School.  David Scott Daniell wrote about his schooldays at BMS in his first novel, Young English.

School houses
Following a tradition of over a hundred years the Senior School Houses of BMS were: North, South, East, West, County and United Boarders. United Boarders comprised the combined boarding houses: Culver, Shakespeare, and School House. The day boy houses often, though not always, reflected the parts of the town or county from which the boys hailed and were mentioned in the chorus of the school song.

A decision was made in October 1997 for the house system to play a more central role in the school and to reinvigorate internal competition whilst upholding its traditions. Six heads of house were appointed from the staff under the direction of a senior head of house, with the brief to establish a modern house system to be integrated into a new school structure and working week, beginning in September 1998.  A competition was launched to establish the new house names. The houses were named in honour of six Old Bedford Modernians who had gained national or international recognition in their field.

Each house has its own tie which consists of stripes of the three school colours and their own house colour. Inter-house sports cover all major and minor sports run by the school, at both junior and senior level, and range from rugby and hockey (major sports) to shooting and fencing (minor sports). There are also non-sporting events such as quizzes and Music and Drama competitions. Students take leadership roles as house captain or house deputies.

Monitors

Monitors are selected, following a written application process, from students in the upper sixth. Each team of monitors works with a specific year group, and are led by two senior monitors, appointed by the head master. Senior monitors, along with the heads of school, are entitled to wear a red trim on their blazer.

Uniform
Boys in years 7 to 11 wear their house tie and school blazer alongside black trousers and a white shirt. Girls may wear the school skirt or black trousers with the school blazer (girls' blazers have a red and black braid).  Sixth form students wear a business suit.

Coeducation
Until 2003, BMS was a day and boarding school for boys. Following 12 years of discussions, Bedford Modern School closed its boarding houses and became coeducational in September 2003. In 2013, BMS celebrated 10 years of coeducation, with a play written by Mark Burgess commissioned to celebrate the event.

Extracurricular activities

Sport

BMS competes against Bedford School, Berkhamsted School, Bishop's Stortford College, Eton College, Hampton School, Harrow School, Kimbolton School, Haileybury, Merchant Taylors, Oakham School, Oundle School, St Albans School, Stowe School and Stamford School in rugby union or rowing.  Other sports include cricket, hockey, athletics, fencing, Rugby fives, football, swimming, table tennis, tennis and water polo.

Bedford Modern has had former students going on to compete at national and international levels including two former captains of the England national rugby union team and a former captain of the England cricket team.

 Olympians: Charles Foulkes (field hockey bronze), John Yallop (rowing silver), Tim Foster (rowing gold), Thomas Hammond (track and field), Sir Sidney Abrahams (long jump), Hamilton Milton (swimming), Peter Knapp (rowing), John Yallop (rowing), Neil Keron (rowing), Rod Chisholm (rowing)
 Paralympian: Julie Rogers
 England rugby caps: Horace Finlinson, WB Thomson, Edgar Mobbs (captain), Arthur Gilbert Bull, Dick Stafford, Harold Day, Dickie Jeeps (captain) and Lionel Edward Weston
 England cricketers: Arthur Jones (captain), Geoff Millman, Monty Panesar.  A.O. Jones invented the cricket position of gully
 Football: James Oswald Anderson played football for Argentina in its first ever official national game against Uruguay in 1902
 Boat Race oarsmen: Sir Archibald Dennis Flower, William Poole, Sir George Godber, David Leadley, Joseph Dominic Kinsella, JD Hughes, Tim Foster, David Gillard, Kenelm Richardson (Cambridge cox)
 Rugby fives British champion: Matt Cavanagh (2004 and 2006)

The school was selected as an official training site for the 2012 Summer Olympics and Paralympics.

Performance arts
Each year, the school puts on two productions, normally musicals, with full orchestra and set, in its 300-seat auditorium. It also hosts its own Shakespeare Festival, in which local schools are invited to take part. The sixth form has its own theatre company, Theatre in Transit, which puts on a piece of theatre each year at professional venues. In September 2014, the Chamber Choir performed The Armed Man at the Royal Albert Hall as part of Sing UK's 'A Mass for Peace'.

Combined cadet force
The school's CCF has existed since 1863. BMS is one of very few schools in the UK to have had all four arms of the Service within its Corps: Army, Royal Air Force, Royal Navy and Royal Marines. The Royal Marines section of the CCF closed in July 2017. Bedford Modern CCF invites students from nearby Bedford Greenacre Independent School and Bedford Free School to be part of the Corps.

Eagle magazine

The school has several of its own publications, the most prominent of which is named The Eagle.

The Eagle has been published mostly biannually since 1881 and doubles as an archive of life at the school during that year.  The Eagle is predominantly designed and edited by sixth form students, and since 2000 is printed as a glossy magazine with around 48 pages.  It often also includes feature articles and interviews with former students.

In addition to The Eagle, other publications include The Eaglet, which, until recently, was included as part of the main magazine, and includes articles from the Junior School.  Another publication is the Eagle News, which is published for the benefit of OBMs.  It includes School news, and follow-up articles of former pupils.  In 1906, the mathematician Eric Temple Bell reported news of an earthquake in San Francisco, where he was resident at the time.

The school is still known for this magazine in the Bedford area, where extra copies were often distributed. However, distribution externally is now limited.

List of headmasters
The following have been Headmasters of Bedford Modern School.

Notable staff 

 Thomas Blyth (1844–1913), later author and commissary to the Archbishop of Ottawa and Bishops of Niagara
 William Hillhouse (1850–1910), first professor of botany at the University of Birmingham
 Edward Mann Langley (1851–1933), founder of the Mathematical Gazette and creator of Langley’s Adventitious Angles
 Sir Percy Nunn (1870–1944), educationalist
 Ronald Welch (1909-1982), author
 Allan Towell (1925-1997), England Rugby International 
 John Moore (born 1943), footballer, 1st team football coach
 David Davies (born 1957) author and historian, former history master
 Mark Burgess (born 1960), actor and playwright, Head of Speech and Drama
 Rob Hardwick (born 1969), England Rugby International
 Chris Willmott (born 1977), football coach and retired English footballer
 Rochelle Clark (born 1981), member of the England women's national rugby union team

Old Bedford Modernians

Former pupils of the school are known as Old Bedford Modernians or OBMs.

Further reading

References

External links

List of Old Bedford Modernians Serving in HM Forces 1914-1918
Bedford Modern School at Henley, 1938

Private schools in the Borough of Bedford
Member schools of the Headmasters' and Headmistresses' Conference
 
Educational institutions established in 1764
Edward Blore buildings
Schools in Bedford
Grade II* listed buildings in Bedfordshire